Richard Li Hua Chin (born 15 October 2002) is a Malaysian professional footballer who plays as a defender or midfielder for Charlton Athletic.

Early life
Chin is of Malaysian and Seychellois descent; his father is a Malaysian Chinese and his mother is from the Seychelles. As a result of his heritage, he is eligible to represent Malaysia, Seychelles, and England internationally. However, he has expressed his interest in representing for Malaysia.

Between 2014 and 2021, Chin attended BETHS Grammar School in Bexley, United Kingdom. In 2017, Chin helped the school to the Under-14s English Schools Cup, alongside future Charlton teammate Euan Williams, as well as Lewis Bate and Samuel Edozie, who have gone on to play for Leeds United and Southampton respectively.

Career 
Chin started his career with Charlton Athletic, joining the club at the age of six. He signed his first professional contract with the club in July 2021.

Chin made his first-team debut in the EFL Trophy on 10 November 2021, starting in a 1–0 defeat to Leyton Orient. 

On 13 September 2022, Chin started his first League One match, playing the first 72 minutes, in a 1–1 draw with Forest Green Rovers. In doing so, Chin became the first person of Malaysian heritage to play in the England's third tier.

Career statistics

Club
.

Notes

References

2002 births
Living people
English people of Malaysian descent
English people of Seychellois descent
English footballers
Association football midfielders
Charlton Athletic F.C. players